Carlos Ferro is an American actor, screenwriter, director, and producer.

Early life
Carlos' first career in the entertainment industry was as a DJ. Leaving music for a career in theatre and television, his work eventually led to a stint as an artist in residence at Cornell University.

Performance
Carlos starred in the show SAL, originally produced at the Climate Theatre in San Francisco then at the Zephyr Theatre in Hollywood. His portrayal of Sal Mineo, co-produced and co-written by him, received a Bay Area Theatre Critics Circle Award nomination for Best Solo Performance.

Since then, he has continued acting in television, both on-camera (in Star Trek: The Next Generation episode Genesis) and in animation voice-over (Justice League, Spawn). He also had a short speaking role as Olivero Sisko in Big Top Scooby-Doo!. He has worked with director John Landis and actors Jerry Lewis, Harvey Fierstein and Dudley Moore.

Video game voice acting

Film production
Extended stays in London and Madrid inspired Carlos to found Argumento Films in 2004. Its first release "RASTROS" was his film writing and directing debut.

Music video production
In 2005 Carlos made his foray into the world of music videos, producing and directing musical artist Stoomie's "Two For a Tenner – Yes Please (Melrose Edit)."

References

External links

 
 Music Video "Two For a Tenner – Yes Please (Melrose Edit)"
 Interview on Tomopop

Living people
American documentary filmmakers
American male stage actors
American male television actors
American male video game actors
American male voice actors
American music video directors
Cornell University staff
Film directors from San Francisco
Hispanic and Latino American male actors
Year of birth missing (living people)
20th-century American male actors
21st-century American male actors